Ebenezer Akorede Okuyeluis an Anglican bishop in Nigeria: he  is the  Bishop of Osun North East.

He was consecrated Bishop of  Osun North East in April 2019 at St David's Anglican Cathedral Church, Ijomu, Akure, by the Primate of All Nigeria, Nicholas Okoh.

In 2022, he was reported by The PIJAlance Magazine to have been involved in a sex scandal with a prostitute.

Notes

21st-century Anglican bishops in Nigeria
Year of birth missing (living people)
Anglican bishops of Osun North East
Living people